The 1984–85 Scottish League Cup was the thirty-ninth season of Scotland's second football knockout competition. The competition was won by Rangers, who defeated Dundee United in the Final.

First round

Second round

Third round

Quarter-finals

Semi-finals

First Leg

Second Leg

Final

References

General

Specific

Scottish League Cup
Scottish League Cup seasons